Hatice Sultan ("respecful lady"; 27 September 1710 – 1738) was an Ottoman princess, the daughter of Sultan Ahmed III and one of his consorts, Rukiye Kadın.

Life

Birth
Hatice Sultan was born on 27 September 1710 in the Topkapı Palace. Her father was Sultan Ahmed III, and her mother was Rukiye Kadın. She had a younger brother, Şehzade Mehmed.

Marriage
In 1724, her father betrothed her to Hafız Ahmed Pasha, a prominent provincial governor, the son of Çerkes Osman Pasha, a distinguished vezir, and a close companion of the Grand vizier Nevşehirli Damat Ibrahim Pasha. On 21 February 1724 the betrothal gifts presented by Hafız Ahmed Pasha were transported from the palace of the grand vizier to the Imperial Palace, and the marriage contract was concluded the same day. The same day also her half-sisters Ümmügülsüm Sultan and Atike Sultan married. Apparently Hafız Ahmed had not yet arrived from Sayda, so his marriage to Hatice was formalised in the presence of his proxy. Hafız Ahmed Pasha arrived four days later. On 6 March 1724, the trousseau of Hatice Sultan was transported from the Topkapı Palace through Ahırkapı Yolu to the Kıbleli Palace that had been assigned to her. Then on 9 March, the princess herself was taken to her palace.

Hatice widowed in 1730, when her husband was killed in the Patrona Halil Rebellion and her father was dethronized. After she remarried with Halil Ağa and had a son.

Issue
By her second marriage, Hatice Sultan had a son: 
Sultanzade Süleyman Izzi Efendi

Charities
In 1728, and 1729, Hatice Sultan commissioned two fountains in Üsküdar. An other fountain was commissioned by her father in her honor.

Death
Hatice Sultan died in 1738 in the Kıbleli Palace, and was buried in New Mosque, Istanbul.

See also
 List of Ottoman princesses

Ancestry

References

Sources

1710 births
1738 deaths
Royalty from Istanbul
18th-century Ottoman princesses